Te Kauwhata was a flag station on the North Island Main Trunk line, in the Waikato District of New Zealand,  south of Auckland.

The name was changed from Wairangi to Waerenga in 1897 and to Te Kauwhata on 28 May 1911. Initially the station served a state experimental farm, but, from 1912, Te Kauwhata township was created.

History 
The station opened on 13 August 1877.

The original station had a platform, shelter and a siding for 61 wagons. Station buildings were added in 1879, a cattle yard and loading platform in 1886, a goods shed from Otorohanga in 1894 and the old Pukekohe station in 1913, as a ladies’ waiting room. A goods shed was built in 1924 and a new station by 1925. There was a station master in 1932.

Track doubling to ease congestion had been authorised in 1914, but work was delayed by the war. Doubling from Ohinewai to Te Kauwhata didn't open until 14 December 1958 and the line to the north remains single, though doubling is being investigated in a business case from July 2021.

Unlocked points caused an express to derail in 1911. Three goods trains crashed at the station in 1930. A shunter was killed in 1931.

Passenger numbers peaked in 1944, as shown in the graph and table below -

Reopening 
A 2018 report to Waikato Regional Council suggested reopening in 2023, as the station has 3 tracks and "Te Kauwhata was considered to be the easiest of these stations to reactivate", the main work being raising the platform. The initial Te Huia train, to commence in August 2020, will not stop at Te Kauwhata. In 2020 reopening of the platform was put forward as a COVID-19 recovery scheme, at an estimated cost of $10m.

References

External links 
 1970s photos

Railway stations in New Zealand
Buildings and structures in Waikato
Rail transport in Waikato
Waikato District
Railway stations opened in 1877
Railway stations closed in 1985
1877 establishments in New Zealand